The Idiap Research Institute is a semi-private non-profit research institute at Martigny in the canton of Valais, in south-western Switzerland. It conducts research in the areas of speech processing, computer vision, information retrieval, biometric authentication, multimodal interaction and machine learning. The institute is affiliated with the École polytechnique fédérale de Lausanne (EPFL), and with the Université de Genève.

History

The institute was founded as the Istituto Dalle Molle di Intelligenza Artificiale Percettiva in 1991 by the Italian entrepreneur Angelo Dalle Molle through the Fondation Dalle Molle, in collaboration with the École polytechnique fédérale de Lausanne and with local, cantonal and federal government bodies. Its purpose was to investigate the application of artificial intelligence to human perception in general, and to recognition and analysis of patterns in particular. In 1996, with the participation of the town of Martigny, the canton of Valais, the EPFL, the University of Geneva and Swisscom, it became a research foundation independent of the Dalle Molle foundation, and shortly after changed its name to Idiap Research Institute.

Idiap is one of the four Swiss research organisations founded by the Dalle Molle foundation, of which three are in the field of artificial intelligence.

Research

Idiap was home to the National Centre of Competence in Research IM2 project on "Interactive Multimodal Information Management".

In addition, notable projects originating from Idiap include Eyeware Tech's head and eye tracking technology.

References

Information technology research institutes
Research institutes in Switzerland
Martigny
Buildings and structures in Valais
University of Geneva
Educational institutions established in 1991
Research institutes established in 1991
1991 establishments in Switzerland